The tectorial membrane of atlanto-axial joint (occipitoaxial ligaments) is situated within the vertebral canal. It represents the superior-ward prolongation of the posterior longitudinal ligament (the two being continuous). It attaches to the body of the axis before terminating superiorly by attaching onto the basilar part of occipital bone superior to the foramen magnum.

Anatomy 

The tectorial membrane is a broad, strong band. It covers the dens of the axis and its ligaments. It is fixed, below, to the posterior surface of the body of the axis, and, expanding as it ascends, is attached to the basilar groove of the occipital bone, in front of the foramen magnum, where it blends with the cranial dura mater.

Relations 
Its anterior surface is in relation with the transverse ligament of the atlas. The tectorial membrane is situated anterior to the spinal dura mater (which is firmly attached to the tectorial membrane).

References 

Bones of the vertebral column